There are over 20,000 Grade II* listed buildings in England.  This page is a list of the 23 Grade II* listed buildings in the district of Elmbridge in Surrey. For links to similar articles in relation to the other 10 districts of Surrey see Grade II* listed buildings in Surrey.


|}

Notes

References 
English Heritage Images of England

External links

 Elmbridge
Lists of Grade II* listed buildings in Surrey
Borough of Elmbridge